Robert B. Flippo (born September 9, 1966) is an American professional baseball coach. He is the bullpen coordinator for the Miami Marlins of Major League Baseball (MLB).

Career
He played college baseball at San Joaquin Delta College, where he was a two-year letterman and all-conference selection in 1986 and at the University of Pacific, where he was a two-year letterman, team captain, and a Conference Scholar Athlete. He played Minor League Baseball for the Bakersfield Dodgers in 1989 before beginning his coaching career.

He was an assistant coach at the University of North Carolina at Wilmington from 1998-2001, where he was the hitting coach as well as outfield and catchers coach. He also coached at Fresno State University and the University of South Alabama.

Los Angeles Dodgers
He joined the Los Angeles Dodgers organization as a coach for the Single-A Wilmington Waves in 2001 before becoming the Dodgers Bullpen Catcher in 2002. He also served as the batting practice pitcher for Hee Seop Choi in the 2005 Home Run Derby and Matt Kemp in the 2011 Home Run Derby and again on July 9, 2012. He was let go by the Dodgers after the 2017 season.

Miami Marlins
Flippo was hired by the Miami Marlins as their bullpen coordinator prior to the 2018 season.

References

External links

1966 births
Living people
Bakersfield Dodgers players
Baseball coaches from California
Baseball players from California
Delta College Mustangs baseball players
Fresno State Bulldogs baseball coaches
Los Angeles Dodgers coaches
Major League Baseball bullpen catchers
Miami Marlins coaches
Pacific Tigers baseball players
People from Lodi, California
South Alabama Jaguars baseball coaches
UNC Wilmington Seahawks baseball coaches